Polystichum imbricans is a species of fern known by the common names narrowleaf swordfern and imbricate sword fern. It is native to western North America from British Columbia to southern California, where it grows in rocky habitat in coastal and inland mountain ranges and foothills. This fern produces several erect linear or lance-shaped leaves up to 80 centimeters long. Each leaf is made up of many narrow, overlapping, sometimes twisting leaflets each 2 to 4 centimeters long. The leaflets have toothed edges. This fern readily forms hybrids, some of which are fertile and are considered separate species, such as Polystichum californicum, its hybrid with P. dudleyi.

References

External links
Jepson Manual Treatment
Photo gallery

imbricans
Ferns of California